The 1978 World Championship Tennis Finals was a men's tennis tournament played on indoor carpet courts. It was the 8th edition of the WCT Finals and was part of the 1978 Colgate-Palmolive Grand Prix, as the World Championship Tennis and the Grand Prix circuits were now combined. It was played at the Moody Coliseum in Dallas, Texas in the United States and was held from May 9 through May 14, 1978. Third-seeded Vitas Gerulaitis won the title and $100,000 first-prize money.

Final

Singles

 Vitas Gerulaitis defeated  Eddie Dibbs 6–3, 6–2, 6–1  
 It was Gerulaitis' 3rd title of the year and the 18th of his career.

Prize money

References

 
World Championship Tennis Finals
World Championship Tennis
World Championship Tennis Finals
World Championship Tennis Finals
WCT Finals